Belimbing may refer to:
 Belimbing, Malaysia, town in Pahang, Malaysia
 Belimbing, West Sumatra, village in West Sumatra, Indonesia
 Kampong Belimbing, village in Brunei